Parkdale is an unincorporated community and census-designated place (CDP) in Hood River County, Oregon,  United States. As of the 2010 census, the population was 311, up from 266 at the 2000 census.

History
Parkdale was founded by David Eccles and R. J. McIsaac in 1910 to serve as a terminus for the Mount Hood Railroad.

Geography
Parkdale is located in central Hood River County at  (45.516976, -121.596923), in the Upper Hood River Valley. Oregon Route 281 is the main road through the community.

Climate
This region experiences warm (but not hot) and dry summers, with no average monthly temperatures above 71.6 °F.  According to the Köppen Climate Classification system, Parkdale has a warm-summer Mediterranean climate, abbreviated "Csb" on climate maps.

Geology
A 6,000-year-old lava flow is named after the town. It flowed north from the Upper Hood River Valley.

Demographics

As of the census of 2000, there were 266 people, 88 households, and 68 families residing in the CDP. The population density was 419.1 people per square mile (163.0/km2). There were 92 housing units at an average density of 145.0 per square mile (56.4/km2). The racial makeup of the CDP is 80.08% White, 4.51% Native American, 0.75% Asian, 11.65% from other races, and 3.01% from two or more races. Hispanic or Latino of any race were 23.31% of the population.

There were 88 households, out of which 43.2% had children under the age of 18 living with them, 58.0% were married couples living together, 10.2% had a female householder with no husband present, and 22.7% were non-families. 15.9% of all households were made up of individuals, and 4.5% had someone living alone who was 65 years of age or older. The average household size was 2.95 and the average family size was 3.21.

In the CDP, the population was spread out, with 30.5% under the age of 18, 10.2% from 18 to 24, 26.7% from 25 to 44, 21.8% from 45 to 64, and 10.9% who were 65 years of age or older. The median age was 34 years. For every 100 females, there were 133.3 males. For every 100 females age 18 and over, there were 122.9 males.

The median income for a household in the CDP was $31,786, and the median income for a family was $34,375. Males had a median income of $52,679 versus $30,313 for females. The per capita income for the CDP was $18,091. About 8.0% of families and 19.7% of the population were below the poverty line, including 33.3% of those under the age of eighteen and none of those 65 or over.

See also
Mount Hood Parkdale, Oregon

References

Census-designated places in Oregon
Unincorporated communities in Hood River County, Oregon
1910 establishments in Oregon
Populated places established in 1910
Census-designated places in Hood River County, Oregon
Unincorporated communities in Oregon